The Goliath tracked mine (German: Leichter Ladungsträger Goliath, "Goliath Light Charge Carrier") was a series of two unmanned ground vehicles used by the German Army as disposable demolition vehicles during World War II. These were the electrically powered Sd.Kfz. 302 and the petrol-engine powered Sd.Kfz. 303a and 303b. They were known as "beetle tanks" by the Allies.

They carried  of high explosives, depending on the model, and were intended to be used for multiple purposes, such as destroying tanks, disrupting dense infantry formations, and the demolition of buildings or bridges. Goliaths were single-use vehicles that were destroyed by the detonation of their warhead.

Development
During and after World War I, a number of inventors devised small, remote-controlled, tracked vehicles intended to carry an explosive charge. During the war, the French developed two vehicles. The Crocodile Schneider Torpille Terrestre carried a  explosive charge and saw limited combat use in June 1916. However, it performed poorly and was eclipsed by the first tanks, then being introduced. The Aubriot-Gabet Torpille Électrique was driven by a single electric motor powered by a trailing cable. This vehicle may have been steered by clutch control on its tracks, although early versions may have lacked steering. This may not have mattered as its task was simply to cross no man's land to attack the long trenches of the enemy. The Wickersham Land Torpedo was patented by American inventor Elmer Wickersham in 1918 and in the 1930s, a similar vehicle was developed by the French vehicle designer Adolphe Kégresse.

The result was the SdKfz. 302 (Sonderkraftfahrzeug), called the Leichter Ladungsträger, or Goliath, which carried  of explosives. The vehicle was steered remotely via a joystick control box. The cable was stored on a cable drum in the rear compartment of the Goliath. The cable was used for steering the vehicle left/right, forwards and reverse (reverse on the electric driven 302 version only) and to ignite the explosive charge. Each Goliath was disposable, being intended to be blown up with its target. Early model Goliaths used two electric motors but, as these were costly to make (3,000 Reichsmarks) and difficult to maintain and recharge in a combat environment, later models (known as the SdKfz. 303) used a cheaper two-stroke petrol engine.

Service

 

Goliaths were used on all fronts where the Wehrmacht fought, beginning in early 1942. They were used principally by specialized Panzer and combat engineer units. Goliaths were used in Italy at Anzio in April 1944, and against the Polish resistance during the Warsaw Uprising in 1944. A few Goliaths were also seen on the beaches of Normandy during D-Day, though most were rendered inoperative after artillery blasts severed their command cables. Allied troops encountered a small number of Goliaths in the Maritime Alps following the landings in southern France in August 1944, with at least one being used successfully against a vehicle of the 509th Parachute Infantry Battalion.

Although a total of 7,564 Goliaths were produced, the single-use weapon was not considered a success due to high unit cost, low speed (just above ), poor ground clearance (just ), the vulnerable control cable, and thin armour which could not protect the vehicle from small-arms fire. The Goliath was also too big and heavy to be easily man-portable. They mostly failed to reach their targets, although the effect was considerable when they did.

Large numbers of Goliaths were captured by the Allies. Although they were examined with interest by Allied intelligence, they were seen as having little military value. Some were used by the United States Army Air Force as aircraft tugs, although they quickly broke down as the disposable vehicles were not designed for sustained use.

The Goliath helped lay the foundation for post-war advances in remote-controlled vehicle technologies.

Romanian version
During 1944, Romania designed and built its own model of remote-controlled tracked mine, known as "Romanian Goliath", due to lack of information about its actual name. However, it was markedly different from its German counterpart. The few surviving photos show that the vehicle had no armour, and it is not known if that was ever changed. It did have some logistical improvements, however, as the Romanian-designed chassis allowed it to cross trenches and craters much better than its German counterparts. Little is known about the vehicle, other than that it never went beyond the prototype stage and that it weighed about two tonnes.

Surviving examples

Surviving Goliaths are preserved at:
 The Museum of World War II, Massachusetts, USA
 The , Germany
 the Deutsches Panzermuseum, Germany
 the Bundeswehr Military History Museum, Dresden, Germany
 The Technik Museum Sinsheim, Germany
 The Tøjhus Museum, Copenhagen, Denmark
 Heeresgeschichtliches Museum, Vienna, Austria
 the Musée du Débarquement Utah Beach, Normandy, France
 Musée des Blindés, Saumur, France
 Musee No. 4 Commando, Ouistreham, Normandy, France
 the Canadian War Museum, Ottawa, Ontario, Canada
 Fort Garry Horse Museum, Winnipeg, Manitoba, Canada
 United States Army Ordnance Museum
 Karl Smith collection, USA
 the Imperial War Museum, Duxford, UK
 The Tank Museum, Bovington Camp, UK
 The REME Museum, UK
 Dutch Cavalry Museum, Netherlands
 War Museum Overloon, Netherlands
 Het Nederlands kustverdedigingsmuseum: 
 Het Memory Oorlogs- en Vredesmuseum Nijverdal, Netherlands
 Royal Museum of the Armed Forces and Military History, Belgium
 December 44 Museum, La Gleize, Belgium
 the Kubinka Tank Museum, Russia
 Arsenał in Wrocław, Poland
 Polish Army Museum, Poland
 Warsaw Uprising Museum, Poland
 Muzeum dopravy (transportation museum), Bratislava, Slovakia.
 Swedish Army Museum, Stockholm, Sweden
 Friends' Association of the Scientific Collection of Defence Engineering Specimens Koblenz (VFF WTS), Koblenz, Germany
 The Flying Heritage & Combat Armor Museum, Everett, Washington, USA

See also
Borgward IV
Mobile Land Mine, equivalent British World War 2 vehicle; fifty built.
Springer (tank)
Teletank, a series of Soviet remote controlled tanks
Unmanned ground vehicle

References
Citations

Bibliography
 Chamberlain, Peter, and Hilary Doyle (1999). Encyclopedia of German Tanks of World War Two,  2nd ed. London: Arms & Armour. .

 Gassend Jean-Loup (2014). Autopsy of a Battle, the Allied Liberation of the French Riviera, August September 1944. Atglen PA: Schiffer Publications.
 Jaugitz, Markus (2001). Funklenkpanzer: A History of German Army Remote-and Radio-Controlled Armor Units, trans. David Johnston. Winnipeg, Manitoba: J.J. Fedorowicz Publishing, Inc. .
 Jentz, Thomas L. Panzer Tracts, No. 14: Gepanzerte Pionier-Fahrzeuge (Armored Combat Engineer Vehicles, Goliath to Raeumer).  S. Darlington,  Maryland: Darlington Productions.

External links
 
 Dutch Cavalry Museum has a Goliath-tank in its collection.
 Goliath in Kubinka tank museum
 Leichte Ladungsträger Goliath Sd.Kfz.302 (E-Motor)
 Leichte Ladungsträger Goliath Sd.Kfz.303a / Sd.Kfz.303b (V-Motor)

World War II infantry weapons of Germany
Military robots
Robots of Germany
1940s robots
Tracked robots
Explosive weapons
Unmanned ground combat vehicles
Military vehicles introduced from 1940 to 1944